Janet Scicluna is the proprietor of Janet Scicluna Associates, Cardiff. In 2007, she was awarded the Queen's Award for Enterprise Promotion.

References

Queen's Award for Enterprise Promotion (2007)
British businesspeople
Living people
Year of birth missing (living people)
Place of birth missing (living people)